Governor Cockburn may refer to:

Sir James Cockburn, 9th Baronet (1771–1852), Governor of Bermuda from 1811 to 1812, from 1814 to 1816 and from 1817 to 1819
Francis Cockburn (1780–1868), Governor of the Bahamas from 1837 to 1844